Pinalia acutifolia is a species of plant within the orchid family. It is native to the Indian subcontinent.

References

acutifolia